Crispiphantes is a genus of Asian dwarf spiders that was first described by A. V. Tanasevitch in 1992.  it contains only two species: C. biseulsanensis and C. rhomboideus.

See also
 List of Linyphiidae species

References

Araneomorphae genera
Linyphiidae
Spiders of Asia
Spiders of Russia